部 is the Chinese character for "part, division". It may refer to:
a government ministry
Ministries of South Korea
numbering by Iroha
 in the Japanese addressing system  
Setsuyōshū
Section headers of a Chinese dictionary
Kangxi radicals
Wamyō Ruijushō
Ruiju Myōgishō
Shinsen Jikyō